The elm cultivar Ulmus 'Folia Aurea' was first identified (as U. campestris var. foliis aureis) by Loudon in Arboretum et Fruticetum Britannicum, 3: 1378, 1838.

Description
Loudon described the tree as having leaves variegated with yellow.

Cultivation
No specimens are known to survive.

References

Ulmus articles missing images
Ulmus
Missing elm cultivars